The Diggers Rest Hotel (2010) is a crime novel by Australian author Geoffrey McGeachin. It is the first in the author's Charlie Berlin mystery series and won the 2011 Ned Kelly Award.

Plot summary

Charlie Berlin, a bomber pilot during WW II, rejoins the Melbourne police force after the war and in 1947 he is sent to Albury-Wodonga to investigate a series of violent robberies.

Reviews

Fair Dinkum Crime found the novel to build to be a winner and that the author "has taken care with the historical detail and it gives the novel a great feeling of authenticity".

Awards and nominations

 2011 winner Ned Kelly Award — Best Novel

References

2010 Australian novels
Australian crime novels
Ned Kelly Award-winning works